Robert Oswald (born 1964 in Baltimore, Maryland) is an American drummer. Oswald is best known as the former drummer for Karma to Burn. He has previously been a member of various bands including Year Long Disaster, Mondo Generator, Nebula,  Buttsteak, Lee Harvey Keitel Band, Caffeine Driven Stress Magnets and Jade. He currently resides in the Laurel Canyon area of Los Angeles with the rest of his band mates.

In 2012, Rob announced that he had retired from music via a post on his personal Facebook account.

Discography

Karma to Burn
Wild, Wonderful Purgatory (Roadrunner Records, 1999)
Almost Heathen (Spitfire Records, 2001)
Appalachian Incantation (Napalm Records, 2010)
V (Napalm Records, 2011)

Mondo Generator
 Cocaine Rodeo (2000, Southern Lord)

Nebula
 Heavy Psych (2009, Tee Pee Records)

References

External links
 www.roboswald.us

1964 births
Living people
Musicians from Baltimore
20th-century American drummers
American male drummers
Mondo Generator members
Karma to Burn members
Year Long Disaster members
20th-century American male musicians